Kasun Madushanka (born 16 July 1991) is a Sri Lankan first-class cricketer. He was selected for Sri Lanka's Test squad for their tour of Zimbabwe in October 2016, but he did not play. In August 2018, he was named in Galle's squad the 2018 SLC T20 League.

References

External links
 

1991 births
Living people
Sri Lankan cricketers
Moors Sports Club cricketers
Sinhalese Sports Club cricketers
Southern Express cricketers
Kandy District cricketers
Place of birth missing (living people)